The Redstone Acceleration & Innovation Network (TRAIN) is an organization launched by FasterCures in 2004 established to create opportunities for medical research organizations to discuss and overcome research challenges that cut across all diseases. TRAIN brings together nonprofit disease research organizations to share information, as well as promote collaboration and innovation in disease research. Headed by FasterCures, TRAIN asserts that collaboration is crucial for efficient biomedical advancement. Participating researchers discuss successes, failures, and best practices that provide lessons learned and valuable ideas that could be scaled up to amplify productivity.

Originally named “The Research Acceleration & Innovation Network,” TRAIN was renamed to “The Redstone Acceleration & Innovation Network” in order to honor a generous grant contribution from Sumner Redstone and the Sumner M. Redstone Charitable Foundation.

Participating Research Organizations
Accelerate Brain Cancer Cure
Accelerated Cure Project for Multiple Sclerosis
Alliance for Aging Research
Alpha-1 Foundation
ALS Therapy Development Institute
Autism Speaks
Ben & Catherine Ivy Foundation
Bonnie J. Addario Lung Cancer Foundation
Cure Alzheimer's Fund
CureDuchenne
Cystic Fibrosis Foundation
The Epilepsy Therapy Development Project
FastForward, LLC (National MS Society)
Focused Ultrasound Surgery Foundation
Foundation Fighting Blindness
Foundation for Accelerated Vascular Research
Hydrocephalus Association
Institute for OneWorld Health
International AIDS Vaccine Initiative
Juvenile Diabetes Research Foundation
Lance Armstrong Foundation
Leukemia & Lymphoma Society
Life Raft Group
Lymphoma Research Foundation
Melanoma Research Alliance
Michael J. Fox Foundation for Parkinson's Research
MPD Foundation
Multiple Myeloma Research Foundation
Myelin Repair Foundation
Pancreatic Cancer Action Network
Parkinson's Action Network
Prostate Cancer Foundation
Susan G. Komen for the Cure
TGen

References
Altevogt, Bruce, Sarah Hanson and Lori Nadig. Venture Philanthropy Strategies to Support Translational Research. Institute of Medicine of the National Academies. 2009 February 25.
Rimer, Skip. “Sumner M. Redstone Charitable Foundation Awards $35 Million Grant to FasterCures/The Center for Accelerating Medical Solutions.” Milken Institute. 2007 April 19. Retrieved 2009 July 1.
"Sumner M. Redstone Commits $105 Million to Fund Cancer and Burn Recovery Research and Patient Care." RedOrbit News. 18 April 2007. Retrieved 2009 July 1. http://www.redorbit.com/news/health/906598/sumner_m_redstone_commits_105_million_to_fund_cancer_and/index.html
"A 'Younger' Redstone Makes a Commitment." OnPhilanthropy News. April 25, 2007. Retrieved 2009 July 1. http://flip.onphilanthropy.com/news_onphilanthropy/2007/04/a_younger_redst.html

External links 
FasterCures website
The Milken Institute website

Medical and health organizations based in Washington, D.C.
Public services
Health care quality
Organizations established in 2004